Mitogen-activated protein kinase kinase kinase 8 is an enzyme that in humans is encoded by the MAP3K8 gene.

Function 

The gene was identified by its oncogenic transforming activity in cells. The encoded protein is a member of the serine/threonine-specific protein kinase family. This kinase can activate ERK1, ERK2 and p38 MAP kinases. This kinase was shown to activate IkappaB kinases, and thus induce the nuclear production of NF-kappaB. This kinase was also found to promote the production of TNF-alpha and IL-2 during T lymphocyte activation. Studies of a similar gene in rat suggested the direct involvement of this kinase in the proteolysis of NF-kappaB1, p105 (NFKB1). This gene may also start transcription at a downstream in-frame translation start codon, and thus produce an isoform containing a shorter N-terminus. The shorter isoform has been shown to display weaker transforming activity. In mice, the gene is known as TPL2 and is a tumor-suppressor gene whose absence contributes to the development and progression of cancer. However, it functions in other organs as a oncogene, promoting cancer.

Interactions 

MAP3K8 has been shown to interact with AKT1, CHUK, NFKB2, NFKB1, C22orf25 and TNIP2.

References

Further reading 

 
 
 
 
 
 
 
 
 
 
 
 
 
 
 
 
 

EC 2.7.11